Flatflesa Lighthouse is a coastal lighthouse located in Aukra Municipality in Møre og Romsdal county, Norway. The original lighthouse was established in 1902 and in 1988 a new automated tower was completed.

The 30,800 candela light emits white, red, or green light (depending on direction) occulting three times every 10 seconds.

The lighthouse was eventually converted into a hotel. There are accommodations for a limited number of guests at the lighthouse, but it is still functioning fully.

See also

 List of lighthouses in Norway
 Lighthouses in Norway

References

External links
 Norsk Fyrhistorisk Forening 
 Picture of Flatflesa Lighthouse

Lighthouses completed in 1902
Lighthouses in Møre og Romsdal
Aukra